Darjan Curanović (born 5 April 1986) is a Slovenian footballer who plays as a goalkeeper for Austrian club SV St. Urban.

Career
On 2 July 2012, it was announced that Curanović will have a trial at League One side Portsmouth, joining up with the squad in Spanish training camp. However, just before leaving for Spain, a club announced that they have financial problems and cancelled all further talks with him.

In July 2013 Curanović joined Leeds United on trial, as a replacement to injured Jamie Ashdown. However, nothing came of it, and he subsequently returned to Triglav Kranj.

References

External links

1986 births
Living people
Sportspeople from Kranj
Slovenian footballers
Association football goalkeepers
NK Triglav Kranj players
NK Olimpija Ljubljana (2005) players
NK Svoboda Ljubljana players
SK Austria Klagenfurt players
NK Fužinar players
OFK Petrovac players
NK Drava Ptuj (2004) players
Slovenian Second League players
Slovenian PrvaLiga players
Slovenian expatriate footballers
Slovenian expatriate sportspeople in Austria
Expatriate footballers in Austria
Slovenian expatriate sportspeople in Montenegro
Expatriate footballers in Montenegro